You're the One is a 1941 American comedy film directed by Ralph Murphy and written by Gene Markey. The film stars Bonnie Baker, Orrin Tucker, Albert Dekker, Edward Everett Horton, Lillian Cornell, Renie Riano and Jerry Colonna. The film was released on February 19, 1941, by Paramount Pictures.

Plot

Cast 
Bonnie Baker as Bonnie Baker
Orrin Tucker as Orrin Tucker 
Albert Dekker as Luke Laramie
Edward Everett Horton as Death Valley Joe Frink
Lillian Cornell as Miss Jones
Renie Riano as Aunt Emma
Jerry Colonna as Dr. Colonna
Teddy Hart as Julius, Luke's Chauffeur
Tom Dugan as Edgar Crump
Walter Catlett as Program Director
Charles Lane as Announcer
Don Castle as Tony Delmar
Mariska Aldrich as Mme. Ziffnidyiff 	
Eddie Conrad as Mr. Ziffnidyiff
Marie Blake as Beauty Shop Operator
Hal K. Dawson as Male Secretary
June Gaude as Beauty Shop Manager
Gerald Oliver Smith as Hotel Clerk
Sammy Cohen as Bellboy
Gilbert Wilson as Hotel Clerk
Foy Van Dolsen as Chester Pugh
Florine McKinney as Archery Girl

Reception
Bosley Crowther of The New York Times reviewed the musical negatively, criticizing it as "perilously close to being the most haphazard, pointless and dull motion picture shown on Broadway this season." He specifically critiqued the acting of Bonnie Baker and Orrin Tucker as being lackluster, and Jerry Colonna and Edward Everett Horton's roles for engaging in "meaningless and unfunny business".

References

External links 
 

1941 films
1940s English-language films
Paramount Pictures films
American comedy films
1941 comedy films
Films directed by Ralph Murphy
American black-and-white films
1940s American films